Gale Agbossoumonde (born November 17, 1991) is a retired soccer player who played as a defender. Born in Togo but was raised in Benin (and later the United States), he represented the United States at international level.

Early life
Agbossoumonde was born in Togo, but his family fled to Benin when he was an infant. At the age of eight, his family moved to Syracuse, New York with the help of a church charity. Agbossoumonde attended Christian Brothers Academy until the 9th grade, leading them to a NYS Soccer Championship runner-up finish that year.

Club career
After a semester with the U17 national team, Agbossoumonde was invited to join U.S. Soccer Development Academy club IMG Academy in Bradenton, Florida. He emerged as a force at centerback, earning high praise for his soccer IQ and his ability to effectively use his already large frame.

Agbossoumonde signed a three and a half year contract with Traffic Sports Marketing and Miami FC on August 6, 2009.  His professional debut shortly followed and he made six appearances during the 2009 USL season. On January 7, 2010, he moved to Sporting Braga of the Portuguese Liga on a six-month loan that included an option to buy. Braga declined the purchase option when the loan spell ended.

Agbossoumonde was sent on loan to Allsvenskan team Djurgårdens IF in 2011. On April 15 he started his first match and went the full 90 minutes for Djurgårdens IF, against Malmö FF, having won "Man of the Match" honors. Agbossoumonde played eight games for Djurgårdens IF during spring 2011, but Djurgården decided not to use their option to buy him out of his contract, and Agbossoumonde left the club at the end of July 2011.

In August 2011, Agbossoumonde was loaned to 2. Bundesliga side Eintracht Frankfurt. Gale received official clearance to play for Eintracht in the beginning of October 2011,  and made his debut for the Eintracht reserve squad in a match on October 8 against SGS Großaspach. However, the loan to the German side proved short, too.

In February 2012, Traffic Sports announced that Agbossoumonde was going on loan to Carolina RailHawks of the North American Soccer League.

In December 2012, Agbossoumonde joined Toronto FC, after he was entered into a weighted lottery to allocate him to a team in Major League Soccer. Agbossoumonde made his debut for Toronto on April 6 due to an injury to starter Danny Califf, the game ended in a 2-2 home draw to FC Dallas.

On May 8, 2014, Agbossoumonde was involved in a three-team trade when the Colorado Rapids traded Marvin Chávez to Chivas USA for Luke Moore, who was immediately traded by Colorado to Toronto FC for Agbossoumonde. At the conclusion of the 2014 season, Colorado declined Agbossoumonde's contract option for 2015.

Agbossoumonde signed with Tampa Bay Rowdies of the North American Soccer League in December 2014. He was released in October 2015.

In December 2015, Agbossoumonde signed with Fort Lauderdale Strikers of the NASL. In 2017 he signed for Pittsburgh Riverhounds. His contract was not renewed following the 2017 USL season, and has since not played professionally.

International career
Agbossoumonde was a member of the United States U-20 team and participated in the 2009 CONCACAF U-20 Championship in Trinidad & Tobago, helping the U.S. to qualify for the 2009 FIFA U-20 World Cup in Egypt. In the tournament in Egypt, although only 17 at the time, he started all games for the Americans.

Agbossoumonde received his first senior national team cap on his birthday, November 17, 2010, against South Africa in the Nelson Mandela Challenge Cup.

Career statistics

Club

International

Honors
United States U20
 Milk Cup: 2010

Individual
 U.S. Soccer Young Male Player of the Year: 2010

References

External links

 
 
 

1991 births
Living people
Soccer players from New York (state)
African-American soccer players
Miami FC (2006) players
S.C. Braga players
G.D. Estoril Praia players
Djurgårdens IF Fotboll players
Eintracht Frankfurt II players
North Carolina FC players
Toronto FC players
Colorado Rapids players
Tampa Bay Rowdies players
Fort Lauderdale Strikers players
Pittsburgh Riverhounds SC players
American expatriate soccer players
Expatriate footballers in Portugal
Expatriate footballers in Sweden
Expatriate footballers in Germany
Expatriate soccer players in Canada
Togolese emigrants to the United States
Sportspeople from Lomé
Sportspeople from Syracuse, New York
United States men's under-20 international soccer players
United States men's international soccer players
USL First Division players
Regionalliga players
Allsvenskan players
North American Soccer League players
Major League Soccer players
USL Championship players
American soccer players
Association football defenders
American people of Togolese descent
Sportspeople of Togolese descent
2009 CONCACAF U-20 Championship players
21st-century African-American sportspeople